Yevsyutino is a rural locality (a village) in Korobitsynskoye Rural Settlement, Syamzhensky District, Vologda Oblast, Russia. The population was 8 as of 2002.

Geography 
Yevsyutino is located 47 km southeast of Syamzha (the district's administrative centre) by road. Yezdunya is the nearest rural locality.

References 

Rural localities in Syamzhensky District